Alexandra Aristoteli (born 24 May 1997) is an Australian group rhythmic gymnast who represented Australia at the 2020 Summer Olympics.

Career 
Aristoteli began ballet when she was four years old because her mother, Maria Aristoteli, is the director of Queensland Dance and Performing Arts. She began training full-time in ballet when she was fifteen years old and spent months training in the United States at the Houston Ballet Academy and the Miami City Ballet School.

Aristoteli began competing with Australia's senior rhythmic gymnastics group in 2018. At the 2018 World Championships, the group finished twenty-ninth in the all-around.

Aristoteli won a gold medal at the 2021 Oceanic Championships with the Australian senior group and qualified a quota for the 2020 Olympic Games. She was selected to represent Australia at the 2020 Summer Olympics alongside Emily Abbot, Alannah Mathews, Himeka Onoda, and Felicity White. They were the first rhythmic gymnastics group to represent Australia at the Olympics. They finished fourteenth in the qualification round for the group all-around.

References

External links
 

1997 births
Living people
Australian rhythmic gymnasts
Sportspeople from Brisbane
Olympic gymnasts of Australia
Gymnasts at the 2020 Summer Olympics